Reina Cristina can refer to more than one topic:

"Reina Cristina" is Spanish for "Queen Christina," and refers to Maria Christina of Austria, Queen Consort of Spain, second wife of Alonso XII.
Reina Cristina was a Spanish cruiser that fought in the Battle of Manila Bay during the Spanish–American War.